Tiduk (also Romanized as Tīdūḵ) is a village in Kahshang Rural District, in the Central District of Birjand County, South Khorasan Province, Iran. At the 2016 census, its population was 7, in 7 families.

References 

Populated places in Birjand County